Lieutenant General John Carl Murchie  (June 7, 1895 – March 5, 1966) was a Canadian soldier and Chief of the General Staff, the head of the Canadian Army from December 27, 1943, until August 21, 1945.

Military career
Murchie graduated with a Military Qualification certificate from the Royal Military College of Canada in Kingston, Ontario in 1915 during World War I. He served with the Royal Regiment of Canadian Artillery, Canadian Army, in France from 1915 to 1917.

He remained in the army during the interwar period, where he attended the Staff College, Camberley from 1929 to 1930.

He also served in World War II and became a General Staff Officer at National Defence Headquarters in 1939. In 1940 he became Director of Military Operations and in 1941 he was made Director of Military Training & Staff Duties. Later that year he was appointed a Brigadier on the General Staff at Canadian Military Headquarters in England. He then went on to be Vice Chief of the General Staff in 1942. He served as Chief of the General Staff from 1944 until 1945, and retired in 1946.

He was awarded the CBE in the 1943 Birthday Honours list.

References

Further reading
4237 Dr. Adrian Preston & Peter Dennis (Edited) "Swords and Covenants" Rowman And Littlefield, London. Croom Helm. 1976.
H16511 Dr. Richard Arthur Preston "To Serve Canada: A History of the Royal Military College of Canada" 1997 Toronto, University of Toronto Press, 1969.
H16511 Dr. Richard Arthur Preston "Canada's RMC – A History of Royal Military College" Second Edition 1982
H16511 Dr. Richard Preston "R.M.C. and Kingston: The effect of imperial and military influences on a Canadian community" 1968 Kingston, Ontario.
H1877 R. Guy C. Smith (editor) "As You Were! Ex-Cadets Remember". In 2 Volumes. Volume I: 1876–1918. Volume II: 1919–1984. RMC. Kingston, Ontario. The R.M.C. Club of Canada. 1984
MapArt Golden Horseshoe Atlas – Page 657 – Grids M13, M14
[https://generals.dk/general/Murchie/John_Carl/Canada.html Generals of World War II[

1895 births
1966 deaths
Canadian Anglicans
Canadian Companions of the Order of the Bath
Knights of the Order of St John
Canadian Companions of the Distinguished Service Order
Canadian military personnel of World War I
People from Edmundston
Royal Military College of Canada alumni
Canadian Commanders of the Order of the British Empire
Canadian Army generals of World War II
Commanders of the Canadian Army
Canadian Expeditionary Force officers
Graduates of the Staff College, Camberley
Canadian generals
Royal Regiment of Canadian Artillery officers
Canadian military personnel from New Brunswick
Canadian Militia officers